Alexis Tendil (12 August 1896, Le Teil, Ardèche – 5 October 2005) was, at age 109, one of the last few surviving French veterans of the First World War. He died in a hospital following a fall.

World War I

In October 1918 Tendil intercepted a message from the Germany High Command which informed the then-Pope Benedict XV of the imminent intention of the German forces to capitulate.

He informed the French command of his discovery and a planned, massive offensive by the French army was postponed.  

After the war, although returning to his ordinary job as an electrician, Tendil became something of a hero being rightly accredited, by his actions, with preventing the deaths of many more soldiers.

1896 births
2005 deaths
People from Ardèche
French centenarians
Men centenarians
French military personnel of World War I